Turris pulchra is an extinct species of sea snail, a marine gastropod mollusk in the family Turridae, the turrids.

Description
Measurements of the shell: 20.0 mm x 6.5 mm.

(Original description) The fusiform shell contains nine whorls. The first four are turbo-form and smooth. The  others are sharply angulated by a shoulder a third of whorl below the suture. They are decorated by twelve to fourteen subequal spiral lines which are slightly nodose where the fine sinuous axial ribs cross them. A beaded sutural collar occurrs just below the indistinct suture. The aperture is elongate with its greatest width above, narrowing below into a slender siphonal canal. The outer lip is thin. The inner lip is slightly calloused.

Distribution
Fossils of this marine species were found in Eocene strata in Oregon and Washington, USA (age range:40.4 to 37.2 Ma)

References

 

pulchra
Gastropods described in 1915
Extinct gastropods